Exposed is the first live album by English musician Mike Oldfield, released as a double album on 27 July 1979 by Virgin Records in the UK. It was recorded at various locations across Europe during Oldfield's debut concert tour as a solo artist, following the release of his fourth studio album Incantations (1978). The album features Incantations and his debut album Tubular Bells (1973) performed in their entirety, plus Oldfield's 1979 non-album single "Guilty" as the encore.

Exposed was initially marketed as a restricted release with just 100,000 copies produced, but strong sales prompted Virgin Records to give the album a full release. It peaked at No. 16 on the UK Albums Chart and earned a silver certification from the British Phonographic Industry for selling 60,000 copies. A concert film of the shows at the Wembley Conference Centre during the 1979 tour were released on DVD in October 2005, also entitled Exposed.

Background and recording
After undergoing Erhard Seminars Training in 1978, the formerly reclusive Mike Oldfield launched a Europe-wide tour with instrumental and choral ensemble to promote his fourth solo album, Incantations.

Initially during the tour the concerts were being recorded without the knowledge of the musicians, so that they could be paid less money, for just a performance and not a recording. The musicians found out, but the recordings went ahead and the album was produced.

The artwork is linked to the title, as it shows a frame of film containing a photo of Oldfield in a concert arena. Among the choir singers were members of the Queen's College, London choir. The all-female choir singers were selected strictly based on their looks.

Due primarily to costs associated with the numerous support singers and musicians, the tour made a net loss of half a million pounds.

The album was recorded using The Manor Studio's Mobile unit, and mixed at The Town House, London. The double vinyl album was released in 4 channel quadraphonic sound using the SQ Quadraphonic encoding system. This was one of the last quadraphonic albums released.

Reissues 
Exposed has been reissued a number of times including a HDCD reissue by Virgin Records in 2000.A double CD version was later released. A DVD version of the concert, recorded at Wembley Conference Centre, was released in 2005.

 the album has not been reissued on CD or digitally by Mercury Records. However, other reissued albums include different live recordings from the same period as Exposed. This comes as part of a deal in which Oldfield's Virgin albums were transferred to Universal's label. With the exception of this record and The Orchestral Tubular Bells, all Oldfield's 1970s albums have been reissued by Mercury Records on CD.

A reissue of Exposed by Universal Music Group on heavyweight vinyl was announced for release on 2 December 2016 on the same day as a vinyl reissue of the Collaborations disc from Oldfield's Boxed compilation.

Track listing

Side one 
 "Incantations (Parts 1 & 2)" (Mike Oldfield) – 26:30

Side two 
 "Incantations (Parts 3 & 4)" (Mike Oldfield) – 20:50

Side three 
 "Tubular Bells (Part 1)" (Mike Oldfield) – 28:36

Side four 
 "Tubular Bells (Part 2)" (Mike Oldfield, except "The Sailor's Hornpipe") – 11:09
 "Guilty" (Mike Oldfield) – 6:22

Personnel 

 Mike Oldfield – guitars, producer
 Nico Ramsden – guitars
 Phil Beer – guitar, vocals
 Pekka Pohjola – bass guitar
 Pierre Moerlen – drums, percussion
 Mike Frye – percussion
 Benoit Moerlen – percussion
 David Bedford – percussion, string arrangements
 Ringo McDonough – bodhrán
 Pete Lemer – keyboards
 Tim Cross – keyboards
 Maddy Prior – vocals
 Ray Gay – trumpets
 Ralph Izen – trumpets
 Simo Salminen – trumpets
 Colin Moore – trumpets
 Sebastian Bell – flutes
 Chris Nicholls – flutes
 Orchestral Leader - Richard Studt - violin
 Benedict Cruft - violin
 Elizabeth Edwards - violin
 Jane Price - violin
 Nichola Hurton - violin
 Jonathan Kahan - violin
 Donald McVay – viola
 Pauline Mack – viola
 Danny Daggers – viola
 Melinda Daggers – viola
 Liz Butler – viola
 Ross Cohen – violins
 Nigel Warren-Green – Cello
 Vanessa Park – cello
 David Bucknall – cello
 Jessica Ford – cello
 Nick Worters – bass
 Joe Kirby – bass
 Debra Bronstein – choir
 Marigo Acheson – choir
 Emma Freud – choir
 Diana Coulson – choir
 Mary Elliott – choir
 Mary Creed – choir

 Cecily Hazell – choir
 Wendy Lampitt – choir
 Clara Harris – choir
 Emma Smith – choir
 Catherine Loewe – choir
 Philp R. Newell – executive recording supervisor, producer
 Alan Perkins – recording engineer
 Greg Shriver – recording engineer
 Kurt Munkacsi – recording engineer
 Ken Capper – assistant
 Chris Blake – assistant
 Sally Arnold – tour co-ordinator

Charts

References

External links 
 Mike Oldfield discography - Exposed at Tubular.net

Mike Oldfield live albums
1979 live albums
Virgin Records live albums